Gahirmatha Marine Sanctuary is a marine wildlife sanctuary located in Odisha and is a very popular tourist attraction of Odisha in India. It is the world's largest nesting beach for Olive Ridley Turtles. It extends from Dhamra River mouth in the north to Brahmani river mouth in the south.
It is very famous for its nesting beach for olive ridley sea turtles. It is one of the world's most important nesting beaches for turtles.

References 

Marine sanctuaries
Wildlife sanctuaries in Odisha
Protected areas established in 1997
1997 establishments in Orissa